Philip Fang Shun-sang (28 March 1941 – 3 November 2013) was a Hong Kong simultaneous interpreter. He provided interpretation services in the United Nations (UN) from 1971 to 1999, having served as chief of its Chinese interpretation section.

Fang received his education in Hong Kong, the United States and the United Kingdom. Before he became chief of UN Chinese interpretation section, he served in the UN as a simultaneous interpreter and was stationed in New York City and Geneva.

In his later years, Fang suffered kidney disease. In 2011, he openly supported the prerequisite of being patriotic to China to be a popularly-elected Chief Executive of Hong Kong, while calling his sister Anson Chan, a pan-democrat, one of Hong Kong's "Gang of Four". Fang fell from his apartment on 3 November 2013 at the age of 72; he was suspected of committing suicide because of illness.

Life

Early years
Philip Fang was born in Hong Kong on 28 March 1941. With ancestors from Shou County, Anhui, he was the fourth child of Fang Shin-hau (1913–1950) and Fang Zhaoling (1914–2006). Fang's father was a textile merchant and the son of Fang Zhenwu (1885–1941), a well-known Kuomintang general who fought against the Japanese during the Second Sino-Japanese War. His mother was a Chinese painter and was apprenticed by Chao Shao-an and Chang Dai-chien. Sir Harry Fang (1923–2009), Shin-hau's younger brother, was a renowned orthopaedist, whose daughter Christine Fang is a former chief executive of The Hong Kong Council of Social Service. Fang had seven siblings; his sister Anson Chan served as Chief Secretary of Hong Kong during British rule, and later as Chief Secretary for Administration as well as an elected Legislative Councillor of the Hong Kong SAR government under Chinese sovereignty.

Overseas career
Fang moved to mainland China with his family at a very young age to avoid war. They resettled in Hong Kong in 1948 due to political instability in the mainland. In 1950, his father Shin-hau died of illness and his family had to be dependent on his father's mother and brother. Fang received his secondary education at Wah Yan College, Hong Kong. He completed his secondary education in 1960 and went on to further his studies in the US. He pursued advanced studies at the University of Surrey in 1966, majoring in language. He graduated in 1970 with a Bachelor of Science degree.

Upon graduation from the University of Surrey, Fang joined the UN Interpretation Department in 1971 as a British subject. In the same year, the UN General Assembly passed a resolution to allow the People's Republic of China to replace the Republic of China as China's representative in the UN. Fang initially served in the UN Secretariat in New York City as a simultaneous interpreter. In 1979, he was promoted to senior simultaneous interpreter at the UN Office at Geneva. He later worked as chief of the UN Chinese interpretation section. In 1999, he applied for early retirement to take care of his ageing mother Fang Zhaoling. In his twenty-eight years of service in the UN, Fang had been working and living abroad, including in New York and Geneva. His interpretation services primarily involved Chinese, English and Russian.

Late years
After his return to Hong Kong, Fang had been taking care of his ageing mother, until she died in 2006 at the age of 92. He became involved in a dispute with his siblings with regard to the allocation of some paintings and property left by his mother; In 2011, Philip and Fang Lam-sang, his brother released a statement, accusing their brothers John and David of embezzling their mother's legacy. Anson Chan, their sister, tried to play the role of a mediator, but her siblings' relationships worsened.

Furthermore, Fang was pro-Beijing, as opposed to his sister Anson, a pan-democrat. He rarely made public his views on politics but, in 2011, he wrote an open letter published in the South China Morning Post, supporting the criterion that the popularly-elected Chief Executive of Hong Kong must be patriotic to China. He even termed Anson, Martin Lee, Jimmy Lai and Joseph Zen as Hong Kong's "Gang of Four", and stated that the four as well as Audrey Eu-led Civic Party were challenging the SAR government. The letter sparked media attention.

In his late years, Fang suffered from mood disorder as he was affected by his kidney disease and the death of his mother. He received medical treatment in Sydney and thereafter lived alone at Tung Chung in Hong Kong. Fang fell from his 16th-storey apartment at around HKT 21:00, 3 November 2013. He was brought to Yan Chai Hospital and pronounced dead an hour later, at the age of 72. He was suspected of committing suicide by jumping off his residence because of illness.

After his death, his brothers went to Kwai Chung Public Mortuary to identify him. A low-profile Catholic funeral was conducted on 10 November 2013 at the Hong Kong Funeral Home with around seventy members of the Fang clan attending. His remains were later cremated.

Personal life
Fang and his family were Catholic. He married Cynthia Fong, a Chinese American, with whom he had two daughters. Fang lived alone in Hong Kong in his later years while his wife and daughters stayed in the United States. After his death, his wife and one of his daughters attended his funeral in Hong Kong; his other daughter was unable to attend as she was heavily pregnant.

See also
Fang Zhenwu's family tree

Notes

References

Chinese-language

 "方順生跳樓亡" (Philip Fang commits suicide), Apple Daily, 5 November 2013.
 "與方曼生爆爭產糾紛" (Philip Fang's family dispute over mother's legacy), Apple Daily, 5 November 2013.
 "腎病抑鬱困擾、政見與姊分歧，陳太四弟方順生墮樓亡" (Anson Chan's brother Philip Fang falls to death), Sing Tao Daily, 5 November 2013.
 "方順生與張國榮服同款藥" (Philip Fang's medical condition similar to that of Leslie Cheung), Sing Tao Daily, 6 November 2013.
 "方順生遣教：特首須愛國" (Chief Executive should be patriotic, said Philip Fang), Wen Wei Po, 6 November 2013.
 "方順生本周日已出殯火化" (Remains of Philip Fang cremated on Sunday), Apple Daily, 13 November 2013.

English-language

 Greenfield, Stanley R., Who's who in the United Nations and related agencies. Omnigraphics, Inc., 1992.
 Fang, Sir Harry, Rehabilitation: A Life's Work. Hong Kong: Hong Kong University Press, 2002.
 Fang, Philip, "Letter to the editor (SCMP)", 20 September 2011.
 "Death of Philip Fang Shun-sang, brother of Anson Chan Fang On-sang", South China Morning Post, 5 November 2013.

External links
 Eulogy by Philip Fang for his late mother Fang Zhaoling
 "方欣浩:伯父日食逾廿粒藥好辛苦" (It had been hard on Uncle to take twenty tablets per day: Arnold Fang), ontv (tv.on.cc)

1941 births
2013 deaths
Alumni of Wah Yan
Alumni of the University of Surrey
Hong Kong Roman Catholics
Chinese officials of the United Nations
United Nations interpreters
20th-century Chinese translators
21st-century Chinese translators